UAM Azcapotzalco is one of the five campi of the Universidad Autónoma Metropolitana system, the second best ranked Mexican public university for the year 2018, according to Times Higher Education. This campus is in the northern area of Mexico City, in the borough of Azcapotzalco. It is one of the three campi built shortly after Mexican President Luis Echeverría decreed the foundation of Universidad Autónoma Metropolitana in 1974.

History 

The creation of Universidad Autónoma Metropolitana was a response to the increasing demand for public higher education in the metropolitan area of Mexico City, which by those years was undergoing severe demographic changes due to a process of conurbation that started in the early 1940s. The main idea was to cope with the demand for this service throughout the outskirts of the metropolitan area, locating the university's campi in the outlying boroughs. Following this principle, UAM Azcapotzalco was one of the first three campi built between 1974 and 1975, along with UAM Xochimilco and UAM Iztapalapa.

Undergraduate studies 
UAM Azcapotzalco hosts 17 majors, lasting between 12 and 15 quarter-terms or four and five years respectively. These programs are organized in three academic divisions as follows:

Basic Sciences and Engineering Division 

Environmental Engineering
Civil Engineering
Computer Engineering
Electrical Engineering
Electronics Engineering
Engineering Physics
Industrial Engineering
Mechanical Engineering
Metallurgic Engineering
Chemical Engineering

Social Sciences and Humanities Division 

Management
Law
Economics
Sociology

Design Sciences and Arts Division 

Architecture
Visual Communication Design
Industrial Design

Graduate studies 

As of 2017, UAM Azcapotzalco offers 22 graduate programs. They are divided as follows:

Basic Sciences and Engineering Division 

MSc in Computer Science
Graduate Studies in Science and Engineering: Specialization, MSc and PhD with Environmental or Materials sciences applications
MSc/PhD in Structural Engineering
MSc/PhD in Process Engineering
MSc/PhD in Optimization

Social Sciences and Humanities Division 

Specialization in Mexican Literature of the 20th century
Specialization in Higher Education Sociology
MA in Law
MSc in Economics
MA in Contemporary Mexican Literature
MSc in Metropolitan Planning and Policies
Graduate Studies in Historiography: Specialization, MA and PhD
MSc/PhD in Economic Sciences
MA/PhD in Sociology
Graduate Studies in Historiography
Graduate Studies in Managerial Sciences

Design Sciences and Arts Division 

Graduate Studies in Ecological Design
Graduate Studies in Urbanism
Graduate Studies in Product Design and Development
Graduate Studies in Information Design and Visualization
Graduate Studies in Landscape Design, Planning and Conservation
Graduate Studies in Rehabilitation, Restoration and Conservation of Tangible Heritage

Notable people

Faculty

Celso Garrido Noguera, founding member of CLACSO's (Latin American Council of Social Sciences) "Entrepreneurs and State in Latin America" project and CEPAL collaborator
Edmundo Jacobo Molina, executive secretariat for Electoral Federal Institute (IFE) since 2008
Rosa Albina Garavito Elías, Mexican politician
Lucia Tomasini Bassols, notable translator and foreign language teaching specialist

Alumni

Rafael Tovar y de Teresa, Mexican diplomat, lawyer and historian. Served as Ambassador of Mexico in Italy from 2001 to 2007, was president of CONACULTA from 1992 to 2000, and Secretariat of Culture from 2015 to 2016.
Pablo Moctezuma Barragán, Mexican politician, writer and scholar
Francisco Alfonso Durazo Montaño, spokesperson for Mexican President Vicente Fox Quesada
Rubén Albarrán, musician, frontman of rock band Café Tacvba
Jesús Humberto Ramos Rosario, The Spectacular Spider-Man illustrator
Arturo Sánchez Gutiérrez, Mexican sociologist and current counselor of the Electoral Federal Institute (2003- )

References

External links 
 Universidad Autónoma Metropolitana Main Portal (in Spanish)
 Portal Grupo Tematico de Algebra y Geometria. Coordinador Dr. Ricardo López
 UAM-Azcapotzalco site (in Spanish)

Universities in Mexico City